The Euler Book Prize is an award named after Swiss mathematician and physicist Leonhard Euler (1707-1783) and given annually at the Joint Mathematics Meetings by the Mathematical Association of America to an outstanding book in mathematics that is likely to improve the public view of the field.

The prize was founded in 2005 with funds provided by mathematician Paul Halmos (1916–2006) and his wife Virginia. It was first given in 2007; this date was chosen to honor the 300th anniversary of Euler's birth, as part of the MAA "Year of Euler" celebration.

Winners
2007: John Derbyshire, Prime Obsession: Bernhard Riemann and the Greatest Unsolved Problem in Mathematics (Joseph Henry Press, 2003). The main subject of this popular-audience book is the Riemann hypothesis, concerning the location of the zeros of the Riemann zeta function, and its application to the distribution of prime numbers. Due to a miscommunication, Derbyshire missed the award ceremony.
2008: Benjamin Yandell, The Honors Class: Hilbert's Problems and Their Solvers (AK Peters, 2002). This book intertwines the stories of the solutions to Hilbert's problems with the biographies of its solvers. The award was given posthumously to Yandell, who died in 2004.
2009: Siobhan Roberts, King of Infinite Space: Donald Coxeter, the Man Who Saved Geometry (Walker and Company, 2006). This biography of Harold Scott MacDonald Coxeter also describes the history of geometry and Coxeter's contributions to the field.
2010: David S. Richeson, Euler's Gem: The Polyhedron Formula and the Birth of Topology (Princeton University Press, 2008). Richeson relates the history of Euler's formula  connecting the numbers of vertices, edges, and faces of a convex polyhedron. The story leads from Euler's first observation in 1750 to modern topology and the mathematics of William Thurston and Grigori Perelman.
2011: Timothy Gowers, The Princeton Companion to Mathematics (Princeton University Press, 2008). This book provides an overview of modern research mathematics; Gowers edited the contributions of 133 distinguished mathematicians as well as writing many of the entries in it himself.
2012: Daina Taimiņa, Crocheting Adventures with Hyperbolic Planes, A. K. Peters 2009
2013: Persi Diaconis, Ronald Graham, Magical Mathematics: The Mathematical Ideas that Animate Great Magic Tricks, Princeton University Press 2011
2014: Steven Strogatz, The Joy of x: A Guided Tour of Math, from One to Infinity, Houghton Mifflin Harcourt, 2012
2015: Edward Frenkel, Love and Math: The Heart of Hidden Reality, Basic Books, 2013
2016: Jordan Ellenberg, How Not to Be Wrong: The Power of Mathematical Thinking, Penguin Press, 2014
2017: Ian Stewart, In Pursuit of the Unknown: 17 Equations That Changed the World, Basic Books, New York, 2012
2018: Matt Parker, Things to Make and Do in the Fourth Dimension, Farrar, Straus and Giroux (2014)
2019: Cathy O'Neil, Weapons of Math Destruction, Crown, 2016
2020: Tim Chartier, Math Bytes: Google Bombs, Chocolate-Covered Pi, and Other Cool Bits in Computing, Princeton University Press, 2014
2021: Francis Su and Christopher Jackson, Mathematics for Human Flourishing, Yale University Press (2020)
2022: Allison Henrich, Emille D. Lawrence, Matthew Pons, and David Taylor, eds., Living Proof: Stories of Resilience Along the Mathematical Journey, MAA and AMS (2019)

See also
 Beckenbach Book Prize
 List of mathematics awards

References

Awards of the Mathematical Association of America